Comanche was a mixed-breed horse who survived George Armstrong Custer's detachment of the United States 7th Cavalry at the Battle of the Little Bighorn (June 25, 1876).

Biography

The horse was bought by the U.S. Army in 1868 in St. Louis, Missouri and sent to Fort Leavenworth, Kansas.  His ancestry and date of birth were both uncertain.  Captain Myles Keogh of the 7th Cavalry liked the  gelding and bought him for his personal mount, to be ridden only in battle. He has alternatively been described as bay or bay dun. In 1868, while the army was fighting the Comanche in Kansas, the horse was wounded in the hindquarters by an arrow but continued to carry Keogh in the fight. He named the horse “Comanche” to honor his bravery.  Comanche was wounded many more times but always exhibited the same toughness.  

On June 25, 1876, Captain Keogh rode Comanche at the Battle of the Little Bighorn, led by Lt. Col. George Armstrong Custer. The battle was notable as their entire detachment was killed.  US soldiers found Comanche, badly wounded, two days after the battle.  After being transported to Fort Lincoln, he was slowly nursed back to health. After a lengthy convalescence, Comanche was retired. In April 1878, Colonel Samuel D. Sturgis issued the following order: 

The ceremonial order inspired a reporter for the Bismarck Tribune to go to Fort Abraham Lincoln to interview Comanche. He "asked the usual questions which his subject acknowledged with a toss of his head, a stamp of his foot and a flourish of his beautiful tail." 

His official keeper, the farrier John Rivers of Company I, Keogh's old troop, saved "Comanche's reputation" by answering more fully. Here is the gist of what the reporter learned (Bismarck Tribune, May 10, 1878):  Comanche was a veteran, 21 years old, and had been with the 7th Cavalry since its Organization in '66.... He was found by Sergeant [Milton J.] DeLacey [Co. I] in a ravine where he had crawled, there to die and feed the Crows. He was raised up and tenderly cared for. His wounds were serious, but not necessarily fatal if properly looked after...He carries seven scars from as many bullet wounds. There are four back of the foreshoulder, one through a hoof, and one on either hind leg. On the Custer battlefield (actually Fort Abraham Lincoln) three of the balls were extracted from his body and the last one was not taken out until April '77…Comanche is not a great horse, physically talking; he is of medium size, neatly put up, but quite noble looking. He is very gentle. His color is 'claybank' He would make a handsome carriage horse... 

In June 1879, Comanche was brought to Fort Meade by the Seventh Regiment, where he was kept like a prince until 1887. He was taken to Fort Riley, Kansas. As an honor, he was made "Second Commanding Officer" of the 7th Cavalry. At Fort Riley, he became something of a pet, occasionally leading parades and indulging in a fondness for beer. 

Comanche died of colic on November 7, 1891, believed to be 29 years old at the time. He is one of only four horses in United States history to be given a military funeral with full military honors, the others were Black Jack, Sergeant Reckless and Chief. His remains were not buried but instead were sent to the University of Kansas and preserved, where the taxidermy mount can still be seen today in the university's Natural History Museum. Comanche was restored by museum conservator Terry Brown in 2005.
 
Comanche is often described as the sole survivor of Custer's detachment, but like so many other legends surrounding the Little Bighorn battle, this one is not entirely accurate.  Other horses survived, but, in better condition after the battle, were taken as spoils of battle.  As historian Evan S. Connell writes in Son of the Morning Star
 
Comanche was reputed to be the only survivor of the Little Bighorn, but quite a few Seventh Cavalry mounts survived, probably more than one hundred, and there was even a yellow bulldog. Comanche lived on another fifteen years, and when he died, he was stuffed and to this day remains in a glass case at the University of Kansas. So, protected from moths and souvenir hunters by his humidity-controlled glass case, Comanche stands patiently, enduring generation after generation of undergraduate jokes. The other horses are gone, and the mysterious yellow bulldog is gone, which means that in a sense the legend is true. Comanche alone survived.

In popular culture

Literature

Movies
Tonka (1958), also released as A Horse Named Comanche, a Walt Disney film starring Sal Mineo, based on David Appel's book
Comanche (2000), a film written and directed by Burt Kennedy, starring Kris Kristofferson and Wilford Brimley

Music
"Comanche (The Brave Horse)" (1961), a song by Johnny Horton

Video Games

See also
Horses in warfare
Military animal
List of historical horses

References

External links

Keogh Family Papers at Autry National
Myles Keough at NPS
, based on the book by David Appel.

1890 animal deaths
Individual warhorses
Individual taxidermy exhibits